The following is a list of awards and nominations received by Kenyan-Mexican actress Lupita Nyong'o. She won her first Academy Award for her feature film debut in 12 Years a Slave (2013), where she became the first Kenyan and Mexican actress to win the award. Nyong'o was also nominated for several awards including a Golden Globe Award for Best Supporting Actress, a BAFTA Award for Best Actress in a Supporting Role and a Screen Actors Guild Awards for Best Supporting Actress, which she won.

Nyong'o made her Broadway debut as a teen orphan in the critically acclaimed play Eclipsed (2015), where she earned a Theatre World Award for Outstanding Broadway or Off-Broadway Debut Performance. In addition, she was nominated for a Tony Award for Best Actress in a Play and a Distinguished Performance Award at the Drama League Award for her performance.

In 2018, Nyong'o co-starred in the superhero film Black Panther, which earned her multiple award nominations, including BET Award for Best Actress, NAACP Image Award for Best Supporting Actress, and a Saturn Award for Best Actress. The following year, she starred and earned nominations for her dual role in the horror film Us (2019), which included a Critics' Choice Movie Award for Best Actress, two MTV Movie Awards, a NAACP Image Award for Best Actress (won), two People's Choice Awards, a Saturn Award for Best Actress, and a Screen Actors Guild Award for Best Actress.

Nyong'o narrated the Discovery Channel's docu-series Serengeti (2019), about wildlife in the Serengeti ecosystem. In 2020, she earned her first Emmy Award nomination for her narration as an Outstanding Narrator, making her the third black woman to be nominated in the category. She was also nominated for an NAACP Image Award for Character Voice-Over Performance.

Major associations

Academy Awards
The Academy Awards is an annual American awards ceremony hosted by the Academy of Motion Picture Arts and Sciences to recognize excellence in cinematic achievements in the United States film industry.

British Academy Film Awards
The British Academy Film Awards are presented in an annual award show hosted by the British Academy of Film and Television Arts.

Emmy Awards
The Primetime Emmy Award is an American award bestowed by the Academy of Television Arts & Sciences in recognition of excellence in American primetime television programming. The Daytime Emmy Award is an American award bestowed by the Academy of Television Arts & Sciences in recognition of excellence in American daytime television programming.

Golden Globe Awards
The Golden Globe Award is an American accolade bestowed by the members of the HFPA recognizing excellence in film and television, both domestic and foreign.

Independent Spirit Awards
The Independent Spirit Awards, founded in 1984, are awards dedicated to independent filmmakers.

Screen Actors Guild Awards
The Screen Actors Guild Award is an accolade given by the Screen Actors Guild‐American Federation of Television and Radio Artists to recognize outstanding performances in film and primetime television.

Tony Awards
The Antoinette Perry Award for Excellence in Theatre, more commonly known informally as the Tony Award, recognizes achievement in live Broadway theatre.

Industry awards

AACTA Awards
The Australian Academy of Cinema and Television Arts Awards, are presented annually by the Australian Academy of Cinema and Television Arts.

Africa Movie Academy Awards
The Africa Movie Academy Awards are presented annually to recognize excellence of professionals in the film industry in the continent of Africa and the diaspora.

BET Awards
The BET Awards were established in 2001 by the Black Entertainment Television network to celebrate African Americans and other minorities in music, acting, sports, and other fields of entertainment over the past year

Black Reel Awards
The Black Reel Awards began in 2000 and were designed to annually recognize and celebrate the achievements of black people in feature, independent and television films.

Critics' Choice Movie Awards
The Critics' Choice Movie Awards is an awards show presented annually by the Broadcast Film Critics Association to honor the finest in cinematic achievement.

Dorian Awards 
The Dorian Awards are an annual endeavor organized by GALECA: The Society of LGBTQ Entertainment Critics (founded in 2009 as the Gay and Lesbian Entertainment Critics Association).

Drama League Awards
The Drama League Awards, created in 1935, honor distinguished productions and performances both on Broadway and Off-Broadway, in addition to recognizing exemplary career achievements in theatre, musical theatre, and directing.

Empire Awards
The Empire Awards, is an annual British awards ceremony honoring cinematic achievements in the local and global film industry.

Fangoria Chainsaw Awards
The Fangoria Chainsaw Awards are an award ceremony focused on horror films and thriller films.

Gotham Awards
The Gotham Awards are American film awards, presented annually to the makers of independent films at a ceremony in New York City.

Hollywood Film Awards
The Hollywood Film Awards are an American motion picture award ceremony held annually since 1997, usually in October or November.

MTV Africa Music Awards
The MTV Africa Music Awards were established in 2008 by MTV Networks Africa (now Viacom International Media Networks Africa) to celebrate the most popular contemporary music in Africa.

MTV Movie & TV Awards
The MTV Movie & TV Awards is a film and television awards show presented annually on MTV.

NAACP Image Awards
An NAACP Image Award is an accolade presented by the American National Association for the Advancement of Colored People to honor outstanding people of color in film, television, music, and literature.

Nickelodeon Kids' Choice Awards
The Nickelodeon Kids' Choice Awards is an annual awards show that airs on the Nickelodeon cable channel that honors the year's biggest television, movie, and music acts, as voted by Nickelodeon viewers.

NME Awards
The NME Awards is an annual music awards show in the United Kingdom, founded by the music magazine, New Musical Express.

Obie Awards
The Obie Awards are annual awards that cover Off-Broadway and Off-Off-Broadway productions that are awarded to theatre artists and groups in New York City.

People's Choice Awards
The People's Choice Awards is an American awards show, recognizing people in entertainment, voted online by the general public and fans.

Satellite Awards
The Satellite Awards are annual awards given by the International Press Academy that are commonly noted in entertainment industry journals and blogs.

Saturn Awards
The Saturn Award is an award presented annually by the Academy of Science Fiction, Fantasy and Horror Films to honor the top works mainly in science fiction, fantasy, and horror in film, television, and home video.

Screen Nation Film and Television Awards 
The Screen Nation Film and Television Awards was founded in 2003 as a platform to raise the profile of black British and international film and television talent of African heritage.

Teen Choice Awards 
The Teen Choice Awards is an annual awards show that airs on the Fox television network. The awards honor the year's biggest achievements in music, film, sports, television, and fashion voted by viewers aged 13 to 19.

Theatre World Awards
The Theatre World Awards is an American honor presented annually to actors and actresses in recognition of an outstanding New York City stage debut performance, either on Broadway or off-Broadway.

Critic Associations

Notes

References

External links
 

Nyong'o, Lupita